Young Turks ( or ) was a political reform movement in the early 20th century that favored the replacement of the Ottoman Empire's absolute monarchy with a constitutional government. They led a rebellion against the absolute rule of Sultan Abdulhamid II in the 1908 Young Turk Revolution. With this revolution, the Young Turks helped to establish the Second Constitutional Era in the same year, ushering in an era of multi-party democracy for the first time in the country's history.

Despite working with the Young Ottomans to promulgate a constitution, Abdulhamid II had dissolved the parliament by 1878 and returned to an absolutist regime, marked by extensive use of secret police to silence dissent, and by massacres committed against minorities. Constitutionalist opponents of his regime, most prominently Prince Sabahaddin and Ahmet Rıza, among other intellectuals, came to be known as Young Turks. Despite the name, Young Turks included many Arabs, Albanians, Jews, and initially, Armenians and Greeks. To organize the opposition, forward-thinking medical students Ibrahim Temo, Abdullah Cevdet and others formed a secret organization named the Committee of Ottoman Union (later Committee of Union and Progress - CUP), which grew in size and included exiles, civil servants, and army officers. Finally, in 1908 in the Young Turk Revolution, pro-CUP officers marched on Istanbul, forcing Abdulhamid to restore the constitution. An attempted countercoup resulted in his deposition.

The Young Turks were a heterodox group of secular liberal intellectuals and revolutionaries, united by their opposition to the absolutist regime of Abdulhamid and desire to reinstate the constitution. The Turkish nationalist, pro-centralization and radical wing among the Young Turks remained in the Committee of Union and Progress. The groups' power struggle continued until 1913, when the Grand Vizier Mahmut Şevket Pasha was assassinated, allowing the CUP to take over all institutions. The new CUP leadership (Three Pashas) established a one party state and exercised absolute control over the Ottoman Empire, overseeing the Empire's entry into World War I on the side of the Central Powers during the war. The CUP regime also planned and executed the Late Ottoman genocides as part of their Turkification policies.

Following the war, the struggle between the two groups of Young Turks revived, with the Freedom and Accord Party regaining control of the Ottoman government and conducting a purge of Unionists with assistance from the Allied powers. The Three Pashas fled into exile. Freedom and Accord rule was short-lived, and with Mustafa Kemal Pasha (Atatürk) stirring up nationalist sentiment in Anatolia, the Empire soon collapsed.

The term "Young Turk" is now used to signify "an insurgent person trying to take control of a situation or organization by force or political maneuver," and various groups in different countries have been named Young Turks because of their rebellious or revolutionary nature. Members of the CUP were known as Unionists, while for most of the world, the Unionists were conflated with the larger Young Turks movement.

History

Origins

Inspired by the Young Italy political movement, the Young Turks had their origins in secret societies of "progressive medical university students and military cadets," namely the Young Ottomans, driven underground along with all political dissent after the Constitution of 1876 was abolished and the First Constitutional Era brought to a close by Abdulhamid II in 1878 after only two years. The Young Turks favored a reinstatement of the Ottoman Parliament and the 1876 constitution, written by the reformist Midhat Pasha.

Congress of Ottoman Opposition

The  was held on 4 February 1902, at 20:00, at the house of Germain Antoin Lefevre-Pontalis a member of the Institut de France. The opposition was performed in compliance with the French government. Closed to the public, there were 47 delegates present. The Armenians wanted to have the conversations held in French, but other delegates rejected this proposition.

The Second Congress of Ottoman Opposition took place in Paris, France, in 1907. Opposition leaders including Ahmed Rıza, Sabahaddin Bey, and Khachatur Malumian of the Armenian Revolutionary Federation were in attendance. The goal was to unite all the parties, including the Young Turks' Committee of Union and Progress, in order to bring about a revolution to reinstate the constitution.

1906–1908

The Young Turks became a truly organized movement with the Committee of Union and Progress (CUP) as an organizational umbrella. They recruited individuals hoping for the establishment of a constitutional monarchy in the Ottoman Empire. In 1906, the Ottoman Freedom Society (OFS) was established in Thessalonica by Mehmed Talaat. The OFS actively recruited members from the Third Army base, among them Major Ismail Enver. In September 1907, OFS announced they would be working with other organizations under the umbrella of the CUP. In reality, the leadership of the OFS would exert significant control over the CUP.

Young Turk Revolution

In 1908, the Macedonian Question was facing the Ottoman Empire. Tsar Nicholas II and Franz Joseph, who were both interested in the Balkans, started implementing policies, beginning in 1897, which brought on the last stages of the Balkanization process. By 1903, there were discussions on establishing administrative control by Russian and Austrian advisory boards in the Macedonian provinces. Abdulhamid was forced to accept this idea, although for quite a while he was able to subvert its implementation.

However, eventually, signs were showing that this policy game was coming to an end. On May 13, 1908, the leadership of the CUP, with the newly gained power of its organization, was able to communicate to Sultan Abdulhamid II the unveiled threat that "the [Ottoman] dynasty would be in danger" if he were not to bring back the Ottoman constitution that he had previously suspended since 1878. On June 12, 1908, the Third Army, which was in Macedonia, began its march towards the Palace in Constantinople. Although initially resistant to the idea of giving up absolute power, Abdulhamid was forced on July 24, 1908, to restore the constitution, beginning the Second Constitutional Era of the Ottoman Empire.

Second Constitutional Era

During the parliamentary recess of this era, the Young Turks held their first open Congress at Salonica, on September–October 1911. There, they proclaimed a series of policies involving the disarming of Christians and preventing them from buying property, Muslim settlements in Christian territories, and the complete Ottomanization of all Turkish subjects, either by persuasion or by the force of arms. The unity among the Young Turks that originated from the Young Turk Revolution began to splinter in face of the realities of the ongoing dissolution of the Ottoman Empire, especially with the onset of the Balkan Wars in 1912. By 1913, the CUP banned all other political parties, creating a one party state. The Ottoman Parliament became a rubber stamp and real policy debate was held within the CUP's Central Committee.

World War I

On November 2, 1914, the Ottoman Empire entered World War I on the side of the Central Powers. The Middle Eastern theatre of World War I became the scene of action. The combatants were the Ottoman Empire, with some assistance from the other Central Powers, against primarily the British and the Russians among the Allies. Rebuffed elsewhere by the major European powers, the Young Turks, through highly secret diplomatic negotiations, led the Ottoman Empire to ally itself with Germany. The Young Turks needed to modernize the Empire's communications and transportation networks without putting themselves in the hands of European bankers. Europeans already owned much of the country's railroad system, and since 1881, the administration of the defaulted Ottoman foreign debt had been in European hands. During the War, the Young Turk empire was "virtually an economic colony on the verge of total collapse."

At the end of the War, with the collapse of Bulgaria and Germany's capitulation, Talaat Pasha and the CUP ministry resigned on October 13, 1918, and the Armistice of Mudros was signed aboard a British battleship in the Aegean Sea. On November 2, Enver, Talaat and Cemal, along with their German allies, fled from Istanbul into exile.

1915–1918: Armenian genocide

The conflicts at the Caucasus Campaign, the Persian Campaign, and the Gallipoli Campaign affected places where Armenians lived in significant numbers. Before the declaration of war at the Armenian congress at Erzurum, the Ottoman government asked Ottoman Armenians to facilitate the conquest of Transcaucasia by inciting a rebellion among the Russian Armenians against the tsarist army in the event of a Caucasian Front.

Jakob Künzler, head of a missionary hospital in Urfa, documented the large scale ethnic cleansing of both Armenians and Kurds under the Three Pashas during World War I. He gave a detailed account of deportation of Armenians from Erzurum and Bitlis in the winter of 1916. The Armenians were perceived to be subversive elements (a fifth column) that would take the Russian side in the war. In order to eliminate this threat, the Ottoman government embarked on a large scale deportation of Armenians from the regions of Djabachdjur, Palu, Musch, Erzurum, and Bitlis. Around 300,000 Armenians were forced to move southwards to Urfa and then westwards to Aintab and Marash. In the summer of 1917, Armenians were moved to the Konya region in central Anatolia. Through these measures, the CUP leaders aimed to eliminate the ostensible Armenian threat by deporting them from their ancestral lands and by dispersing them in small pockets of exiled communities. By the end of World War I, up to 1,200,000 Armenians were forcibly deported from their home vilayets. As a result, about half of the displaced died of exposure, hunger, and disease, or were victims of banditry and forced labor.

Around this period, the CUP's relationship to the Armenian genocide shifted. Early on, Armenians had perceived the CUP as allies; and the beginnings of the genocide, in the 1909 Adana massacre, had been rooted in reactionary Ottoman backlash against the Young Turks' revolution. But during World War I, the CUP's increasing nationalism began to lead them to participate in the genocide. In 2005, the International Association of Genocide Scholars affirmed that scholarly evidence revealed the CUP "government of the Ottoman Empire began a systematic genocide of its Armenian citizens and unarmed Christian minority population. More than a million Armenians were exterminated through direct killing, starvation, torture, and forced death marches."

Ideology

Materialism and positivism

A guiding principle for the Young Turks was the transformation of their society into one in which religion played no consequential role, a stark contrast from the theocracy that had ruled the Ottoman Empire since its inception. However, the Young Turks soon recognized the difficulty of spreading this idea among the deeply religious Ottoman peasantry and even much of the elite. The Young Turks thus began suggesting that Islam itself was materialistic. As compared with later efforts by Muslim intellectuals, such as the attempt to reconcile Islam and socialism, this was an extremely difficult endeavor. Although some former members of the CUP continued to make efforts in this field after the revolution of 1908, they were severely denounced by the Ulema, who accused them of "trying to change Islam into another form and create a new religion while calling it Islam".

Positivism, with its claim of being a religion of science, deeply impressed the Young Turks, who believed it could be more easily reconciled with Islam than could popular materialistic theories. The name of the society, Committee of Union and Progress, is believed to be inspired by leading positivist Auguste Comte's motto Order and Progress. Positivism also served as a base for the desired strong government.

Centralized government
After the Committee of Union and Progress took power through the 1913 coup and Mahmud Şevket Pasha's assassination, it embarked on a series of reforms in order to increase centralization in the Empire, an effort that had been ongoing since the last century's Tanzimat reforms under sultan Mahmud II. Many of the original Young Turks rejected this idea, especially those that had formed the Freedom and Accord Party against the CUP. Other opposition parties against the CUP like Prince Sabahaddin’s  and the Arab Ottoman Party for Administrative Decentralization, both of which made opposition to the CUP’s centralization their main agenda.

Nationalism

In regards to nationalism, the Young Turks underwent a gradual transformation. Beginning with the Tanzimat with ethnically non-Turkish members participating at the outset, the Young Turks embraced the official state ideology: Ottomanism. However, Ottoman patriotism failed to strike root during the First Constitutional Era and the following years. Many ethnically non-Turkish Ottoman intellectuals rejected the idea because of its exclusive use of Turkish symbols. Turkish nationalists gradually gained the upper hand in politics, and following the 1902 Congress, a stronger focus on nationalism developed. It was at this time that Ahmed Rıza chose to replace the term "Ottoman" with "Turk," shifting the focus from Ottoman nationalism to Turkish nationalism.

Prominent Young Turks

The prominent leaders and ideologists included:
 Pamphleteers and activists
 Tunalı Hilmi
 Yusuf Akçura, a Tatar journalist with a secular national ideology, who was against Ottomanism and supported separation of church and state
 Ayetullah Bey
 Osman Hamdi Bey, an Ottoman-Greek painter and owner of the first specialized art school in Istanbul (founded 1883)
 Emmanuel Carasso Efendi, a lawyer and a member of the prominent Sephardic Jewish Carasso family
 Mehmet Cavit Bey, a Dönmeh from Thessalonica, Jewish, by ancestry but Muslim by religion since the 17th century, who was Minister of Finance; he was hanged for treason in 1926.
 Abdullah Cevdet, a Kurdish intellectual who is a supporter of biological materialism and secularism
 Marcel Samuel Raphael Cohen (aka Tekin Alp), born to a Jewish family in Salonica under Ottoman control (now Thessaloniki, Greece), became one of the founding fathers of Turkish nationalism and an ideologue of Pan-Turkism.
 Agah Efendi, founded the first Turkish newspaper and, as postmaster, brought the postage stamp to the Ottoman Empire (although he died in 1885, he was honored for founding the first Turkish newspaper).
 Ziya Gökalp, a Turkish nationalist from Diyarbakir, publicist and pioneer sociologist, influenced by modern Western European culture
 Talaat Pasha, whose role before the revolution is not clear
 Ahmed Riza, worked to improve the condition of the Ottoman peasantry; he served as agricultural minister, and later as education minister.
 Military officers
 Ahmed Niyazi Bey, initiator and a leader of the Young Turk Revolution 
 Enver Pasha, a leader of the Young Turk Revolution and later prominent Young Turk politician
 Eyüp Sabri, a leader of the Young Turk Revolution
 Bekir Fikri, a prominent participant in the Young Turk Revolution
 Atıf Kamçıl, a prominent participant in the Young Turk Revolution
 Subhi Bey Abaza (lived in Sidon)
 Resat Bey

Aftermath and legacy
The founder of modern Turkey, Mustafa Kemal Atatürk, is quoted on the front page of the 1 August 1926 The Los Angeles Examiner as denouncing the Young Turks and especially the CUP (the "Young Turk Party"):

Historian Uğur Ümit Üngör, in his book The Making of Modern Turkey: Nation and State in Eastern Anatolia, has claimed that the "Republican People's Party, which was founded by Mustafa Kemal, was the successor of CUP and continued ethnic cleansing policies of its predecessor in Eastern Anatolia until the year 1950. Thus, Turkey was transformed into an ethnically homogenous state."

As to the fate of the Three Pashas, two of them, Talaat Pasha and Cemal Pasha, were assassinated by Armenian nationals shortly after the end of World War I while in exile in Europe during Operation Nemesis, a revenge operation against perpetrators of the Armenian genocide. Soghomon Tehlirian, whose family was killed in the Armenian genocide, assassinated the exiled Talaat Pasha in Berlin and was subsequently acquitted on all charges by a German jury. Cemal Pasha was similarly killed by Stepan Dzaghikian, Bedros Der Boghosian, and Ardashes Kevorkian for "crimes against humanity" in Tbilisi, Georgia. The third pasha, Enver Pasha, was killed in fighting against the Red Army unit under the command of Hakob Melkumian near Baldzhuan in Tajikistan (then Turkistan).

References

Notes

Bibliography
 .
 .
 .
 .
 .
 .
 
 .

Further reading 
 Necati Alkan, "The Eternal Enemy of Islam: Abdullah Cevdet and the Baha'i Religion", Bulletin of the School of Oriental and African Studies, Volume 68/1, pp. 1–20; online at Bulletin of the School of Oriental and African Studies
 .
 David Fromkin, A Peace to End All Peace
 M. Şükrü Hanioğlu, Preparation for a Revolution: The Young Turks, 1902–1908, Oxford University Press 2001, 
 
 Hasan Kayali. Arabs and Young Turks: Ottomanism, Arabism, and Islamism in the Ottoman Empire, 1908–1918. Berkeley: University of California Press, 1997
 Stephen Kinzer, Crescent and Star: Turkey Between Two Worlds, Farrar, Straus and Giroux 2001, 
 Yves Ternon, Empire ottoman : Le déclin, la chute, l'effacement, Paris, édition du Félin, 2002,  
  - Discusses how the ideals of the French Revolution affected the Young Turks

External links

 Committee of Union and Progress Turkey in the First World War (website)
 Young Turks and the Armenian Genocide (website)

 
Politics of the Ottoman Empire
Rebel groups in Turkey
Reform in the Ottoman Empire
Turkish nationalism